Another One may refer to:

Albums 
 Another One (Mac DeMarco album), 2015
 Another One (Oscar Pettiford album), 1955

Songs 
 "Another One", by Conor Maynard from the album Contrast
 "Another One", by dvsn from the album Sept. 5th
"Another One", by Kim Petras from the album Clarity
 "Another One", by Mac DeMarco from the album Another One
 "Another One", by Oscar Pettiford from the album Another One
 "Another One", by Remy Ma
 "Another One", by Sam Smith from the album Love Goes
 "I Told You / Another One", by Tory Lanez from the album I Told You